This is a summary of the year 2009 in British music. 31 singles have occupied the number-one spot including 15 new entries. Due to the increase in downloads over physical sales, singles now tend to enter the chart at a lower position, before climbing to the top a few weeks later: a trend which was previously rarely seen in the later half of the 1990s and most of the 2000s.

Summary of UK chart activity

January
Alexandra Burke's "Hallelujah", the Christmas number-one single of 2008, remained at the top of the Singles Chart for a third week on 4 January. One week later, however, American singer-songwriter Lady Gaga's debut single "Just Dance" went to number one, and stayed there for the remainder of the month. Elsewhere in January, Girls Aloud scored their twentieth consecutive top ten single with "The Loving Kind", while Beyoncé returned to the top ten with "Single Ladies (Put a Ring on It)", the second single from her I Am… Sasha Fierce album. American rapper Kid Cudi made his top ten debut with "Day 'n' Nite" which peaked at number two, whilst The Saturdays' third single "Issues" peaked at number four.

Kings of Leon's Only by the Night album, which spent two weeks at number one in 2008, returned to the top of the Albums Chart on 11 January on the strength of their recent single "Use Somebody", while The Script's eponymous debut album – another number one of last year – also returned to the peak of the chart. Indie rock band White Lies scored their first number one album when debut LP To Lose My Life... topped the charts on 25 January, while Lady Gaga's debut album The Fame entered at number three.

February
Lady Gaga finally got knocked off the number one spot by Lily Allen, who scored her second number one with "The Fear". Alesha Dixon's second single, "Breathe Slow" from her album The Alesha Show climbed up to number six, two weeks before its CD release. It finally climbed up to number three two weeks later, her highest peaking solo hit.

White Lies got knocked off from the number one album spot by Bruce Springsteen with his new album, Working on a Dream. Franz Ferdinand's third album, Tonight, missed out at number two. Bruce Springsteen kept number one for another week, whilst The View's second album Which Bitch? entered at number four.

Rapper Eminem returned with "Crack a Bottle", which entered the singles chart at number four on downloads alone, his first hit in four years. This month also saw the re-entry of M.I.A. with her song "Paper Planes" due to the multi-BAFTA-winning film Slumdog Millionaire. The lead single from the first The Prodigy album in five years, "Omen", peaked at number four on the singles chart.

March
Kelly Clarkson, the winner of the first series of American Idol, scored her first UK number one single on 1 March with "My Life Would Suck Without You", the lead single from her fourth studio album All I Ever Wanted. Teenage country/pop singer Taylor Swift jumped 20 places to number two with "Love Story". Kelly Clarkson then got knocked down to number four by Flo Rida with "Right Round" who prevented The Saturdays from getting number one with "Just Can't Get Enough" which was the first time in 14 years that the Comic Relief song did not hit number one. The second Comic Relief song, "Barry Islands in the Stream" got to number one a week later and a week after that it got knocked off by Lady Gaga who gained a surprise second number one with "Poker Face". On 29 March, Noisettes entered the top forty for the first time with "Don't Upset The Rhythm (Go Baby Go)" at number two, Pussycat Dolls' new single "Jai Ho! (You Are My Destiny)" with A.R. Rahman climbed to number five and "Halo" by Beyoncé got to number four.

Kings of Leon got knocked off from the number one album spot by The Prodigy with their first studio album in five years, Invaders Must Die. The Prodigy then got knocked off from number one by U2 with their first album in five years, No Line on the Horizon which outsold the rest of the top forty combined to claim the top spot. U2 kept the top spot the next week whilst Kelly Clarkson's album All I Ever Wanted went straight in at number four and Annie Lennox got to number two with The Annie Lennox Collection. On Mother's Day week Ronan Keating topped the albums chart with Songs for My Mother, while Annie Lennox stayed at number two.

April
On the first chart of April, Lady Gaga stayed at number one on the singles chart with "Poker Face" which went on to become the UK's biggest-selling single of 2009.Metro Station's debut song "Shake It" climbed to number six and La Roux's song "In for the Kill" climbed up into the top ten after a fortnight at number eleven, reaching number seven. The next week La Roux climbed higher to number four, Calvin Harris knocked Lady Gaga off the top with "I'm Not Alone" and Ciara's new single, "Love Sex Magic" with Justin Timberlake entered at number six. On 19 April, Calvin Harris stayed at number one for a second week with "I'm Not Alone". La Roux climbed 2 places to number two, knocking Lady Gaga to number three, and Pussycat Dolls to number four. Eminem gained the highest new entry with "We Made You". On 26 April the aptly titled "Number 1" by Tinchy Stryder and N-Dubz went straight in at number one. Curiously, despite 23 releases since chart records began, no other single has ever reached number one, referencing its chart position in the title. They saw off competition from La Roux, who was a non-mover at 2 whilst Calvin Harris dropped two places to number 3. Climbers included Eminem who rose three places to 5 and Lily Allen rose one place to 9. Lady Gaga however dropped one place to number 4 and Ciara Feat. Justin Timberlake also slightly dropped.

On the first albums chart of the month, Lady Gaga finally climbed to number one with The Fame, knocking off Ronan Keating with Songs for My Mother and Flo Rida's second album R.O.O.T.S. debuted at number five, becoming his highest charting album to date. The next week Lady Gaga kept number one with new albums from Doves at number two and Bat for Lashes with Two Suns at number five. On 26 April, Lady Gaga kept her reign over the albums chart keeping her album "The Fame" at the summit for a month despite heavy competition from Depeche Mode.

May
On the first chart of May, the top two remained static, whilst at three, pushing Lady Gaga and Calvin Harris down one each, was Ironik and Chipmunk's remix of Elton John's "Tiny Dancer". Girls Aloud only managed to climb to number eleven, therefore breaking their run of consecutive top tens with "Untouchable". The next week Tinchy Stryder and N-Dubz got knocked down to number two as The Black Eyed Peas' comeback single "Boom Boom Pow" debuted at the top on downloads alone. Lily Allen and Eminem both benefited from physicals as they went to number five and four respectively. Black Eyed Peas were knocked from number 1 by another new entry, Dizzee Rascal with his new hit "Bonkers". Eurovision winner Alexander Rybak also had a top ten placing with "Fairytale".

Lady Gaga finally got knocked from the number one album spot by Bob Dylan with Together Through Life, his first studio album in almost three years. The Enemy's new album Music for the People went straight in at number two. On 17 May Bob Dylan got knocked down seven places by Green Day's new album 21st Century Breakdown which only had two days of sales to get to number 1. The long-awaited comeback album from musician Eminem titled Relapse goes straight to the top becoming this year's fastest selling album with over 166,000 copies in its first week in the UK. Also in the top ten was Madness' new album and Journal for Plague Lovers by Manic Street Preachers at numbers five and three respectively.

June
On the first chart of June, Black Eyed Peas regained the number one spot from Dizzee Rascal after Britain's Got Talent winners, Diversity danced to it in their winning routine. Agnes's debut single in the UK Release Me peaked at number three. Keri Hilson's follow-up single "Knock You Down" climbed to number six. On 14 June chart, Pixie Lott debuted at number one with her single "Mama Do (Uh Oh, Uh Oh)". Also on the singles chart, "When Love Takes Over" by David Guetta featuring Kelly Rowland charted at number seven after a rush release due to a "cover" version being released on iTunes, before climbing to the top spot a week later. The cover, by Airi L, charted at number twenty-two. The following week, David Guetta was knocked off the number one spot by a new entry from La Roux; the band's third single, "Bulletproof". Also this week, the top one hundred singles chart saw a staggering twenty-eight re-entries from Michael Jackson (six of which reached the top forty), following the singer's death. Lady Gaga's third single, "Paparazzi" entered the top five at number four.

Paolo Nutini reached the number one albums spot with his second album Sunny Side Up whilst Daniel Merriweather's debut album went straight to number two. The next week Kasabian went straight in at number one on the albums chart with West Ryder Pauper Lunatic Asylum. Other high new entries on the albums came from The Black Eyed Peas with The E.N.D. at three and Little Boots with Hands at five. Following the death of "King of Pop" Michael Jackson, his album Number Ones reclaimed the top spot after first reaching number one in 2003. His album, Thriller, also re-entered the top-ten albums chart at number seven. Five other albums by Michael Jackson also re-entered the top one-hundred albums chart, King of Pop, Off the Wall, The Essential Michael Jackson, Thriller 25 and Bad. In this otherwise fairly quiet week, the highest new entry was at number fifteen for The Music of My Life by Neil Sedaka, while big climbers going back into the top 5 came from Take That with The Circus moving up 12 to 4, and Lady Gaga with The Fame moving up 18 to 5.

Oasis begins the summer stadium leg of their world tour with 3 sold-out homecoming concerts at the 70,000 capacity Heaton Park between 4 and 7 June.

July

On 5 July, thirty-seven Michael Jackson songs reached the Top 100 (beating last week's record of twenty-eight), thirteen of which reached the Top 40, breaking Elvis Presley's record of seven, the highest of those was "Man in the Mirror" which reached number two, it was beaten to number one by Cascada with "Evacuate the Dancefloor", which knocked the previous week's number one "Bulletproof" by La Roux down to number three.

In the Album Chart, a total of eleven Michael Jackson albums reached the Top 100, with The Essential Michael Jackson making it to the top spot. Number One's and King of Pop were also both in the top five and Thriller and Off The Wall made the top ten, the highest new entry was La Roux's self titled debut album which reached number two. With The Essential Michael Jackson knocking Number Ones off the top spot, Jackson became only the third act to ever manage two consecutive No. 1 albums – the first act to do it was The Beatles who achieved the feat twice, and later Mike Oldfield became the second. Florence and the Machine, with her debut album Lungs, which was released on 6 July, spent five weeks at No. 2 behind Michael Jackson.

After two weeks at the top spot, "Evacuate the Dancefloor" was knocked to No. 2 by JLS' debut single "Beat Again." The second highest new entry that week came from Chicane, who reached No. 7 with his trance reworking of "Hoppípolla" by Sigur Rós, entitled "Poppiholla". 3OH!3 also released debut single "Don't Trust Me" in the UK and charted at No. 21, while "21 Guns" by Green Day reached No. 40 after a twenty place climb on physical release. The following week however, it climbed to No. 39 as Michael Jackson's songs dropped. This became the band's lowest peaking single to date, peaking 15 places lower than previous single "Know Your Enemy".

JLS continued on to spend a second week at the summit, fighting off competition from the week's highest new entry, Mr Hudson and Kanye West's Supernova at No. 2 and I Gotta Feeling by The Black Eyed Peas which stayed at No. 3. With the release of Now 73 that week, five 'older' songs re-entered the chart – the highest was Lily Allen with Not Fair at No. 28. The only other new entry that week was Frankmusik's  Confusion Girl (Shame Shame Shame), and Beyoncé climbed up into the top ten with Sweet Dreams, the fourth top ten single from I Am... Sasha Fierce.

August

On 2 August, The Black Eyed Peas finally reached number one with I Gotta Feeling, seven weeks after it was first available. The highest new entry was I Made It Through The Rain by John Barrowman at No. 14, after a campaign on Chris Moyles' BBC Radio 1 breakfast show to get the song into the charts. The next week saw the Black Eyed Peas replaced by the second number 1 for Tinchy Stryder, Never Leave You (with Amelle Berrabah from girl band Sugababes). On the album chart Michael Jackson's greatest hits The Essential remained at No. 1 for a sixth week, with Florence + The Machine's Lungs at No. 2 for a fifth week. Tinchy Stryder's run only lasted one week as 16 August saw the Black Eyed Peas return to No. 1 on the singles chart with "I Gotta Feeling" climbing back to the top, and Michael Jackson's seventh and final week at No. 1 on the albums chart. This week (16 August) also saw Beyoncé's latest album, I Am... Sasha Fierce, raise to its highest peak thus far of No. 2, after 39 weeks on the chart, due to the success of her latest top 5 single, "Sweet Dreams".

Both charts saw new number 1s the following week, with David Guetta achieving his second number 1 with Sexy Bitch, this time featuring Akon as the vocalist. Calvin Harris replaced Michael Jackson at the top of the albums chart with Ready for the Weekend, with the single of the same name reaching No. 3, while Tinchy Stryder's album Catch 22 reached No. 2.

The final number 1 single of August saw Dizzee Rascal's third chart topper in a row with Holiday, which like his previous year's number 1 Dance Wiv Me was produced by Calvin Harris and also features R&B singer Chrome. The Arctic Monkeys entered at number 1 on the albums chart with Humbug.
 
On 28 August a backstage fight before a concert, between brothers Noel Gallagher and Liam Gallagher led to the official splitting up of the Britpop band Oasis, announced by brother Noel on the band's website. Oasis was later said to be continuing without Noel under the new name Beady Eye.

September

Another new number 1 single on 6 September, with Jay-Z teaming up with Rihanna and Kanye West for Run This Town. At number 2 was the Sugababes with Get Sexy, their biggest hit in two years, and at number 6, Kings of Leon made a surprising return to the top 10 with 2008 hit Sex on Fire, which regained popularity after the summer festival season and being covered on the ITV1 talent show The X Factor. On the albums chart the Arctic Monkeys spent a second week at No. 1, while Dame Vera Lynn's greatest hits album We'll Meet Again climbed to number 2. It was the 70th anniversary of the outbreak of World War II, when her career flourished, and at the age of 92, this made her the oldest ever living person to have an album chart that high. Kings of Leon repeated their success from the singles chart with their album Only by the Night climbing from outside the top 20 back to number 4.

On 13 September, Pixie Lott broke the record for the largest jump to number 1 within a top 75, with "Boys and Girls" climbing 72 places after being No. 73 the previous week. There was also competition from Mika, returning after two years with "We Are Golden", new dance group Mini Viva with "Left My Heart in Tokyo", rock band Muse returned with "Uprising", the lead single from new album The Resistance and Shakira returned after three years with "She Wolf", all entering at No. 4, #7, No. 9 and No. 25 respectively. Meanwhile, Lady Gaga's fourth single LoveGame peaked at number 19, despite the song's controversial music video and lyrics. However, it had already entered the charts earlier in the year thanks to download sales from her debut album The Fame.

October
Taio Cruz's Break Your Heart remained at the top spot for the first week of October, beating the likes of Madonna. The following week Chipmunk's third single Oopsy Daisy reached the top spot making it his first UK number one hit, and second hit inside the top 10. On 18 October Alexandra Burke's new song from her new album featuring Flo Rida 'Bad Boys' reached the number one spot. The final number one single of October was Cheryl's debut solo single Fight For This Love which was the fastest selling single of the year.

November

Robbie Williams and JLS battled for the No.1 spot in the UK Album Chart, but once it reached 15 November by a margin of less than 1% (around 2,000 copies), it was JLS & their self-titled debut album that reached the top, beating Robbies Reality Killed the Video Star. Their 2nd single, Everybody in Love also topped the chart for a week from 14 November. On 29 November, Susan Boyle has topped the UK album chart this week with her debut release I Dreamed A Dream. Peter Kay's Animated All Star Band were up 17 places this week, topping the UK singles chart with The Official BBC Children in Need Medley. This was followed by last week's number one, The X Factor Finalists at number two with "You Are Not Alone". Having topped the download chart this week, Jason Derulo was a non-mover at number three in the singles chart with "Whatcha Say". This was followed by The Black Eyed Peas at four with "Meet Me Halfway" and Lady Gaga up three places to number five with "Bad Romance". The highest new entry inside the top ten came from Rihanna, as her new single "Russian Roulette" came in at number six this week.

December

The first week of the last month of the decade started with Peter Kay's Animated All Star Band remaining at number one for a second week, holding off Rihanna's "Russian Roulette" which climbed to number two. new entries in the top ten included Alicia Keys' "Doesn't Mean Anything" at number eight and Timbaland featuring SoShy and Nelly Furtado with "Morning After Dark" at number nine. Susan Boyle remained at the top of the album chart (where it has now been for three weeks). On 13 December, Lady Gaga's "Bad Romance" climbed to number one, therefore making chart history as Gaga now holds the title of most number one singles by a female artist in one year (tallying three). In the same week Kesha finally broke into the top five, and Timbaland climbed to number six.

The Chart upset of the decade came in December, as the Christmas number one was achieved not by the X Factor winner, Joe McElderry but by 1990s rap metal band Rage Against the Machine. A Facebook group, set up to halt "Simon Cowells stranglehold on the charts" by getting the 1992 "Killing in the Name" to the top of the charts, got 750,000 members and led Rage Against the Machine to the first download-only Christmas number one, selling over 500,000 copies – ahead of Joe McElderry by 50,000. In the following week's chart (week ending 2 January 2010) McElderry's single, "The Climb" made it to the number one spot.

Number ones

Singles

Albums

Compilation albums

Other charts
UK Dance Chart number-one singles of 2009
UK Indie Chart number-one singles of 2009
UK Rock Chart number-one singles of 2009
UK R&B Chart number-one singles of 2009
List of top 10 singles in 2009

Year-end charts

Best-selling singles of 2009

Best-selling albums of 2009

Best-selling compilation albums of 2009

Notes:

Best-selling artist of 2009 (singles and albums)

Total album sales
Total sales for albums in 2009 amounted to 128,946,805 the lowest since 1999. This record would be beaten in 2013 when only 94,000,000 albums were sold.

References

Charts
United Kingdom
British record charts